Li Lingrong (李陵容) (351 - 9 August 400), formally Empress Dowager Xiaowuwen (孝武文太后, literally "the filial, martial, and civil empress dowager") was an empress dowager during Jin Dynasty (266–420).  She was a concubine of Emperor Jianwen and the mother of Emperor Xiaowu.

Life
Li Lingrong was born of a humble origin, and she became a servant girl in the household of Sima Yu the Prince of Kuaiji.  She was one of the servants involved with manufacturing textiles.

Concubine
Sima Yu originally had a wife from high birth—Princess Wang Jianji (王簡姬), who bore him his heir apparent Sima Daosheng (司馬道生) and Sima Yusheng (司馬俞生).  However, Sima Daosheng was described as careless and frivolous.  In 348, while Sima Yu was prime minister for his grandnephew Emperor Mu, Sima Daosheng was accused of unspecified crimes. He was deposed and died in imprisonment. Princess Wang died in distress. Sima Yusheng and three other sons of Sima Yu all died early, leaving him without an heir, and his concubines were not conceiving any more. He hired a practitioner of physiognomy to look at his concubines and see which one could conceive an heir. The practitioner looked at all of them and opined that none was destined to give him an heir—but then he saw Li Lingrong, who was tall, dark-skinned and who was derogatorily referred to as "Kunlun". The practitioner, in surprise, yelled out, "She is the one!" Sima Yu therefore took her as a concubine, and she bore him two sons—Sima Yao in 362 and Sima Daozi in 363. Sima Yao was subsequently named heir apparent. She also bore Sima Yu a daughter, who would later be Princess Poyang.

Empress dowager
In 371, the paramount general Huan Wen, in order to showcase his power, deposed Sima Yu's nephew Emperor Fei and replaced him with Sima Yu (as Emperor Jianwen). Emperor Jianwen ruled only for one year, dying in 372.  He did not create her any special titles, but he did create her son Sima Yao crown prince.  Sima Yao, after Emperor Jianwen's death, ascended the throne as Emperor Xiaowu.  Initially, out of respect for his father's deceased wife Princess Wang, he did not honor Consort Li as empress dowager, but did progressively honor her with greater and greater imperial consort titles.  In 387, he honored her as Consort Dowager (皇太妃), with all ceremonial trappings of an empress dowager.  In 394, after a petition by Sima Daozi (by now the Prince of Kuaiji), she was finally honored as empress dowager.

Empress Dowager Li's influence during Emperor Xiaowu's reign appeared to be limited, as Emperor Mu's mother Empress Dowager Chu was regent early, and after she gave up regent authorities in 376, power was largely in the hands of Xie An until Emperor Xiaowu fully turned adult. She was described as often mediating conflicts between him and Sima Daozi, and throughout his reign, Sima Daozi had great authority as the emperor's brother and prime minister.

Grand empress dowager
Emperor Xiaowu was killed by his concubine Honoured Lady Zhang in 396 after humiliating her. He was succeeded by his developmentally disabled son Emperor An, and Empress Dowager Li was honored as grand empress dowager on 29 April 397. She died on 9 Aug 400 and was mourned with ceremony due an empress, but was not buried with Emperor Jianwen or worshipped with him in his temple, but instead was worshipped in the same temple that housed Emperor Jianwen's mother, Consort Zheng Achun (鄭阿春).

References 

Jin dynasty (266–420) empresses dowager
400 deaths
Year of birth unknown
4th-century births
Chinese grand empresses dowager
4th-century Chinese women